The Hovey Delta Bird is an American ultralight aircraft that was designed by Bob Hovey in 1982 and supplied as plans for amateur construction.

Design and development
It features a biplane wing configuration, a single-seat, open cockpit, conventional landing gear and a single engine in tractor configuration.

The aircraft is made from pop-riveted and gusseted aluminum tubing, with the wings and tail surfaces covered in doped aircraft fabric covering. The controls are conventional three-axis, with full-span ailerons on the top wing. The landing gear is bungee suspended and includes main wheel brakes and tailwheel steering. Common engines used include the  Cuyuna 430R in the Delta Bird and the  Kawasaki 440 in the Delta Hawk.

Variants
Delta Bird
Base model, an open cockpit design, with the pilot's seat mounted to the main keel tube.
Delta Hawk
Model with conventional fabric-covered fuselage,  empty weight and  gross weight.
Super Delta Hawk
Model with sheet aluminum covered fuselage.

Specifications (Delta Bird)

References

1980s United States ultralight aircraft
Homebuilt aircraft
Single-engined tractor aircraft